Pasanga 2 : Haiku is a 2015 Indian Tamil-language children's film written, co produced and directed by Pandiraj. A thematic sequel to Pasanga (2009), the film focuses on the issue of attention deficit hyperactivity disorder (ADHD) amongst children and is set in the city, unlike Pasanga. The film, starring debutante child actors Nishesh and Vaishnavi in lead alongside Ramdoss, Vidya Pradeep, Karthik Kumar and Bindu Madhavi. This film is produced by Suriya, who also appears in an extended cameo role along with Amala Paul. The film was the last film of year 2015 and was declared as a "year end blockbuster". The film will mark Pandiraj's last of the trilogy for children, following Pasanga and Marina.

Plot
Kavin (Nishesh) and Naina (Vaishnavi) are two children who get pushed out of school because of their hyperactive activities. Their parents are not able to bear the attitude of their children and transfer them through many schools. Accidentally, they end up with a child psychiatrist Thamizh Nadan (Suriya) and his wife Venba (Amala Paul). The two children were sent to a hostel, where they miss their parents dearly. They escape from the hostel and follow Thamizh and Venba’s children to their home. Thamizh suggests that Kavin and Naina join a school where Venba is a teacher, where they let children be themselves. Their parents think and reluctantly send them to the school. While Kavin and Naina study there, they are selected, along with Venbas son Abhiman, to participate in a talent show. There, Kavin dances and Naina tells the story of her life. Once the competition is over, Tamizh and Venba leave immediately, along with their children. When Kavin and Naina's parents questioned them why they did so, they replied with satisfaction that all they needed was for the children to participate and not to win. The parents then realise their mistakes. Kavin and Naina also regret their mischievous behaviour. The film ends with an ambulance honking, and they prayed. The families lived happily. During the credits, it shows paper boats showing celebrities having attention deficit hyperactivity disorder, along with their bio.

Cast

 Suriya as Dr. Thamizh Nadan
 Amala Paul as Venba Thamizh Nadan
 Nishesh as Kavin
 Vaishnavi as Naina 
 Ramdoss as Kathir
 Karthik Kumar as Akhil
 Vidya Pradeep as Divya Kathir
 Bindu Madhavi as Vidya Akhil
 Yash as Senthil
 Aarush as Abhiman
 Tejaswini as Kamakshi
 Vinodhini Vaidyanathan as Sailaja
 Dheepa Ramanujam as Principal
 George Maryan as Hostel Warden
 Delhi Ganesh
 Imman Annachi as Program Organiser
 G. Gnanasambandam
 Ramakrishnan
 Ravishankar
 Gajaraj as a baby's father 
 Pandi as Bully (guest appearance)
 Soori as Sanjay Ramasamy (guest appearance)
 Jayaprakash (guest appearance)
 Samuthirakani as a girl's father (guest appearance)
 R. V. Udayakumar (guest appearance)
 Manoj Kumar (guest appearance)
 Sirpy (guest appearance)
 Seenu Ramasamy (guest appearance)
 Namo Narayana (guest appearance)
 Shabareesh Varma (guest appearance)

Production
By June 2014, Suriya launched his second production under his then new-launched studio 2D Entertainment, a children's film by Pandiraj. Suriya had wanted to begin 2D Entertainment with a newcomer's film and listened to over 50 scripts but said that he was impressed by Pandiraj's script only, adding that his story was entertaining and had a message.

According to the director, the film will offer a beautiful experience to all". Pandiraj was searching for nearly eight months for suitable children to play the protagonists, meeting about 150 children, before selecting Nishesh, Vaishnavi and Aarush. Bindu Madhavi, who had worked with Pandiraj in Kedi Billa Killadi Ranga, was given a lead role and Karthik Kumar was cast as her romantic interest. Suriya besides producing the film agreed to play Tamil Naadan, a social activist. A source from the film's unit revealed that his role was not a cameo, but one of 40 minutes length. Paired opposite Suriya was Amala Paul, who enacted the role a teacher named Venba. Before Amala Paul was signed for the role, Jyothika was under consideration, with Pandiraj stating that it "would be nice" if Jyothika played that role.

The director initially shot for few days in July 2014 but then had to put it back to complete Idhu Namma Aalu. Principal photography with Suriya commenced on 25 February 2015. In May 2015, a song was filmed on Suriya and over 60 children. Suriya and Amala Paul's portions were wrapped up later that month. In August, Pandiraj announced that the title "Haiku" would not be retained, and that he would come up with a new title to take exploit the Tamil Nadu Government's rule of entertainment tax exemption for films with Tamil titles. The title was later revealed to be "Pasanga 2".

Indiaglitz mentioned that the film offers umpteen infotainment and the messages are conveyed without being preachy. Apt stress has been made on the importance of the complete dedication and involvement of both the parents and family in various phases of growth of a kid.

Soundtrack

Music and soundtracks were composed Pisaasu fame Arrol Corelli. The soundtrack features for songs, the lyrics for which are written by Na. Muthukumar, Madhan Karky and Yugabharathi. Behindwoods rated the album 3 out of 5 and called it "Pasanga 2 is a feel good album which stays true to the film’s theme".

Release
The satellite rights of the film were sold to Jaya TV. A Telugu dubbed version, titled Memu, was released simultaneously in Andhra Pradesh and Telangana on 8 July 2016.

Critical reception
The film received positive reviews from critics. Behindwoods rated the film 3.5 out of 5 and wrote, "Do a favor to Tamil cinema, watch Pasanga 2, let other superstars try what Suriya has!". Indiaglitz rated the film 3.25 out of 5 and wrote, "An enjoyable and enlightening ride into the world of kids". Kollytalk rated the film 3.5/5, stating "Message for everyone". The Times of India rated 3 out of 5 stars stating "The film will certainly appeal to an undemanding viewer." Sify rated 3 out of 5 stars stating "Pasanga 2 is a neat family entertainer and a must watch for both parents and current generation kids." Hindustan Times rated 2 out of 5 stars stating "Pandiraj’s Pasanga 2 starring Surya and Amala Paul has a novel core plot but the film takes an awfully long time to get to the point, and when it does, it spins out of focus, weighing us down with inane incidents and slapstick humour." India Today rated 3 out of 5 stars stating "While many directors in Kodambakkam worry about the corruption in India, here is Pandiraj who has sincere concern for our families and kids. His worries about the commercialisation of education, deprivation of 'family time' in a busy urban lifestyle and rank-oriented education are all apparent in this film, and it has a simple storyline." Deccan Chronicle rated 3 out of 5 stars stating "Pandiraj has packaged several issues in an entertaining manner without being preachy."

Online Release
Herotalkies has legally released Pasanga 2 Tamil movie on their online movie streaming portal to overseas customers.

Box office
The film performed well at the box office and three weeks after release, the makers announced that the film would be screened free for children under ten years old. The movie grossed over 50 crore worldwide theatrical ran 75 days.

References

External links

Indian children's films
2015 films
2010s Tamil-language films
Films directed by Pandiraj
Child characters in film
Indian pregnancy films